Guy Mantzur is an Israeli music producer based in Tel Aviv. He established his own record label, Plattenbank, in 2009. 

He released his first album, Moments, in 2013, and followed up the following year with Time with Sahar Z. The latter album is described by Decoded Magazine as "distinctly mind blowing on all levels of melodic music".

Discography

Albums
Moments, 2013, Sudbeat Music
Time (with Sahar Z), 2014
Children With No Name (with Khen), 2016
A Guy in Itajai, 2018

Singles & EPs
"My Golden Cage" (with Khen), Bedrock, 2019
"Tremolo Man/Chasing the Fog", Lost & Found, 2018

References

Electronic dance music DJs
Israeli DJs
Progressive house musicians
Remixers